Elections to the United States House of Representatives in Florida were held for three seats in the 58th Congress on November 4, 1902.

Background
Since 1872, Florida had been apportioned 2 seats in the House of Representatives.  After the 1900 census, Florida was apportioned a third Representative.  Going into the 1902 elections, Florida was represented by two Democrats, one who'd been elected in 1894, and the second in 1896.  Both incumbents ran for re-election, while the new  was an open seat.

Election results
All three seats were uncontested in the general election

See also
1902 United States House of Representatives elections

References

1902
Florida
United States House of Representatives